Inhumanoid is a 1996 American film. It was part of the Roger Corman Presents series on Showtime.

Plot
A family of three is travelling in space, when they encounter a spaceship with one survivor. They discover the rest of the people on the ship were killed, and the survivor turns out to be an emotionally unstable android programmed without morals.

Cast
 Richard Grieco as Adam
 Lara Harris as Katrina Carver
 Corbin Bernsen as Foster Carver
 Edie McClurg as Dr. Marianne Snow
 Robin Gammell as Dr. Milton
 Brittany Ashton Holmes as Amy Carver

Production
The film was written and directed by Victoria Muspratt, a Canadian short film maker who worked as the assistant to the director of development. She wanted to direct but Corman did not think women would make good action directors. She shot a short film made with an insurance payout and persuaded Corman. The film was shot over 18 days with a budget of US$700,000. It was pitched as Dead Calm in space.  Musprat said, "I hope to make four or five more features with Roger’s `graduate film school,’ then, I plan to be the next Francis Ford Coppola."

References

External links
 
 Inhumanoid at Letterbox DVD

1996 films
Films produced by Roger Corman
American science fiction television films
American horror television films
1996 horror films
1990s science fiction horror films
American science fiction horror films
1990s English-language films
1990s American films